Bradáč (feminine Bradáčová) is a Czech surname. It is derived from the word brada, meaning "beard".
 Lenka Bradáčová, Czech prosecutor
 Věra Bradáčová, Czech athlete
 Vojtěch Bradáč, Czech footballer
 Zdeněk Bradáč, Czech magician

Czech-language surnames